The Obama Syndrome: Surrender at Home, War Abroad is a 2010 book by British-Pakistani writer, journalist, political activist and historian Tariq Ali.

Synopsis
The book, described as "a merciless dissection of Obama's overseas escalation and domestic retreat", is strongly critical of the presidency of Barack Obama. Ali argues little has changed since George W. Bush left office, with appeasement of Israel continuing, genuine domestic reform abandoned, torture and drone strikes continuing and Wall Street being bailed out without reform.

Reception
In The Guardian, Stryker Maguire, editor of LSE Review, wrote "I was prepared to dislike Ali's The Obama Syndrome: Surrender at Home, War Abroad more than I did in the end", and "stripped of its Gore Vidal-school tendentiousness, the book has some reasonable things to say about the Obama presidency", while in the New York Journal of Books, the reviewer wrote "Ali’s progressive stance confronts the illusions sold to voters in 2008 by a compliant media and capitalist firms".

References

2010 non-fiction books
Books about Barack Obama
Books about the Obama administration
Obama Syndrome
Obama Syndrome
Obama Syndrome
Books by Tariq Ali
English-language books
Obama Syndrome
Obama Syndrome